The Late Show is a 1977 American neo-noir mystery film written and directed by Robert Benton and produced by Robert Altman. It stars Art Carney, Lily Tomlin, Bill Macy, Eugene Roche, and Joanna Cassidy.

A drama with a few comic moments, the story follows an aging detective trying to solve the case of his partner's murder while dealing with a flamboyant new client.

Benton was nominated for the Academy Award for Best Original Screenplay in 1977.

Plot
A financially strained, aging Los Angeles private detective named Ira Wells isn't a well man and is barely active in the business. He is a loner who doesn't much care for company or small talk. When his ex-partner Harry Regan shows up at Ira's boarding house one night, mortally wounded while on a case, Ira feels it's up to him to get to the bottom of it.

The trail leads Ira to a small-time fence named Birdwell, whose young bodyguard Lamar is only too happy to rough up the old man when Ira pays a call. But they make a mistake in intimidating and underestimating Ira, who ends up paying Lamar back in kind as well as tracking down Birdwell's missing wife.

Meanwhile, a would-be client named Margo Sperling is introduced to Ira by a mutual acquaintance, Charlie Hatter, a tipster. Margo is a quirky individual who acts as an agent for a singer, sells marijuana on the side and wants to hire Ira to find not a murderer but just her missing cat.

As they get to know each other after a rocky start, Ira and Margo hit it off to the point that she offers to become his new partner. But first they need to deal with a dangerous confrontation in Margo's apartment.

Cast
 Art Carney as Ira Wells
 Lily Tomlin as Margo Sperling
 Bill Macy as Charlie Hatter
 Eugene Roche as Ronnie Birdwell
 Joanna Cassidy as Laura Birdwell
 John Considine as Lamar
 Ruth Nelson as Mrs. Schmidt
 John Davey as Sergeant Dayton
 Howard Duff as Harry Regan

Production

In early 1976, Robert Benton brought his script to Robert Altman who, after reading it, decided to produce the film. While Benton had co-authored screenplays for several films, he was the sole author for The Late Show, which was also only the second film that Benton directed. Production began in spring of 1976 and wrapped in November. Lou Lombardo, who had a long relationship with Altman and edited several of Altman's films in the 1970s, edited along with Peter Appleton.

Ruth Nelson, playing the landlady Mrs. Schmidt, was a founder of the Group Theatre. It was her first film role since Arch of Triumph in 1948.

Reception

Critical reception
The Late Show got extremely positive reviews when it was initially released in 1977. Pauline Kael wrote: "The Late Show never lets up; the editing is by Lou Lombardo (who has often worked with Robert Altman) and Peter Appleton, and I can't think of a thriller from the forties that is as tight as this, or has such sustained tension...The Late Show is fast and exciting, but it isn't a thriller, exactly. It's a one-of-a-kind movie—a love-hate poem to sleaziness." Variety declared that Benton "has given Carney and Tomlin the freedom to create two extremely sympathetic characters. Both performances are knockout and should draw solid notices for this little-ballyhooed pic. Distrib Warner Bros. may just have a sleeper on its hands." Vincent Canby of The New York Times called the film "a funny, tightly constructed, knowledgeable, affectionate rave that all of us can share." Roger Ebert wrote in the Chicago Sun-Times: "And most of all, it's a movie that dares a lot, pulls off most of it, and entertains us without insulting our intelligence," giving the film a four-star rating. Gene Siskel of the Chicago Tribune also gave the film four out of four stars, calling it "a marvelous comedy" and "an old-style film full of character, a genuine throwback to Hollywood's best efforts." He ranked the film second (behind only Annie Hall) on his year-end list of the best films of 1977. Charles Champlin of the Los Angeles Times called the film "an artful and affectionate original, lively and enjoyable on its own self-sufficient terms, which catches the spirit and reflects the structure of the previous private eye pleasures." Gary Arnold of The Washington Post called it "a modestly conceived but surprisingly satisfying entertainment, a private-eye melodrama that looks and sounds up-to-date while respecting the traditions and conventions of the genre." Louise Sweet of The Monthly Film Bulletin was negative, calling the film a "wrongheaded attempt at nostalgic recreation" with Tomlin miscast in "a stereotyped role" and Benton directing at "a sluggish, almost geriatric pace."

An appreciation of the film was penned by Doug Krentzlin in 2014, who called the film "a unique, one-of-a-kind film that lived up to its advertising tagline 'The nicest, warmest, funniest, and most touching movie you’ll ever see about blackmail, mystery, and murder.'"

The Late Show has a 94% rating at Rotten Tomatoes, based on 35 reviews.

Awards and nominations
The film received many award nominations, several for Benton's screenplay. Carney's performance won him the National Society of Film Critics Award for Best Actor. Tomlin's performance was nominated for the BAFTA Award and the Golden Globe Award, and she won the Silver Bear for Best Actress at the 27th Berlin International Film Festival. The film was nominated for the Golden Bear at the Berlin Film Festival. Benton's screenplay was nominated for the Writers Guild of America Award (Best Drama Written Directly for the Screen) and for the Academy Award for Best Original Screenplay. Benton won the award for Best Motion Picture Screenplay at the Edgar Awards.

Television series
The film was the inspiration for the short-lived US television series Eye to Eye (1985).

Home video
The Late Show was released as a zone 1 DVD in 2004. It previously had been released as a VHS tape.

References

External links
 
 
 

1977 films
1970s American films
1970s English-language films
1970s mystery films
American neo-noir films
American detective films
Edgar Award-winning works
Films directed by Robert Benton
Films with screenplays by Robert Benton
Warner Bros. films